Marek Sloboda (born 1 November 1997) is a Slovak professional ice hockey player who currently playing for HK Dukla Trenčín of the Slovak Extraliga.

Career statistics

Regular season and playoffs

International

References

External links

1997 births
Living people
Ice hockey people from Bratislava
Slovak ice hockey left wingers
Motor České Budějovice players
HC Slovan Bratislava players
Bratislava Capitals players
HC Nové Zámky players
HC '05 Banská Bystrica players
HC ZUBR Přerov players
HK Dukla Trenčín players
Slovak expatriate ice hockey players in the Czech Republic